Stefano Belotti (born 23 July 2004) is a diver who competes internationally for Italy. His last result is the second place for the men's 3m springboard (14-15) during the European Junior Championships 2019. He competes in 10m platform, 1m springboard, 3m springboard, jump event, synchronized diving 3m and team event. He won the gold medal with Matteo Santoro in synchronized diving 3m and the silver in 1m springboard during the European Junior Championships 2022.

References

Italian male divers
2004 births
Living people